2004 Cricket World Cup statistics lists all the major statistics and records for the 2003 Cricket World Cup held in South Africa, Zimbabwe and Kenya from 9 February to 24 March 2003.

Talha Jubair became the youngest player to participate in Cricket World Cup. Sri Lanka's clinical demolition of Canada for 36 runs created a new World Cup record for the lowest innings score, a dubious distinction that was, at the time, the lowest score in ODI history. Records tumbled when defending champions Australia took on minnows Namibia, with Glenn McGrath claiming the World Cup's best bowling figures (7/15), a performance that helped Australia defeat Namibia by 256 runs. Team-mate Adam Gilchrist created a new wicket-keeping dismissal record in the same match, with 6. Against Namibia, Indian players Sachin Tendulkar and Sourav Ganguly recorded the second highest partnership in World Cup cricket (244 runs). India and Australia clashed in a one-sided battle in the final, with Australia creating multiple records (highest World Cup final score, highest score by a captain in a World Cup final – Ricky Ponting, most sixes by a batsman – Ponting) in a match; with Australia winning by 125 runs. Tendulkar's 673 runs, the most runs scored in a single World Cup history to date, was the consolation for India as he won the 2003 Cricket World Cup Man of the Series award. The World Cup also saw fielding records in an innings (Mohammad Kaif) and tournament (Ponting). The World Cup broke the record for most sixes in the tournament (with 266), but this was easily surpassed in the 2007 edition (with 373).

Records

Team totals

Highest team totals
The highest score of the 2003 Cricket World Cup came in the finals when Australia scored 359 runs against India in 50 overs. This represents the highest score made in the finals of Cricket World Cup.

Note: Only scores of 310 or higher are listed.

Lowest team totals
Canada were bowled out for the lowest ever total in World Cup history against Sri Lanka; which was also, at the time, the lowest ever total in ODI history.

Note: Only scores of 100 or lower are listed.

Bowling

Most wickets in the tournament
Vaas's haul of 23 wickets in the tournament was, at the time, the record in World Cup history. His record was equalled or bettered by three bowlers in the 2007 edition of the World Cup (Glenn McGrath, Muttiah Muralitharan and Shaun Tait).

Note: Only top 10 players shown. Sorted by wickets then bowling average.

Best bowling
Note: Only top ten performances listed.

Batting

Most runs in the tournament
The 2003 Cricket World Cup had four cricketers scoring over 400 runs in the tournament (two Indians and two Australians), a record that has been bettered when ten cricketers scored more than 400 runs in the 2007 Cricket World Cup. Sachin's 673 runs in the 2003 Cricket World Cup is the current record for most runs scored in a single edition in World Cup history.

Note: Only top 10 players shown. Sorted by total.

Highest individual scores
Twenty one individual centuries were scored in the 2003 Cricket World Cup, the highest across all editions.

Note: The top ten scores are listed below.

Highest partnerships of the tournament
There were 25 century partnerships in the tournament, in comparison to 28 century partnerships in the 1999 Cricket World Cup. The top ten partnerships have been listed below. The 244 run partnership between Ganguly and Tendulkar is currently the second highest partnership in World Cup history.

Highest partnerships for each wicket

Fielding

Most catches in a match

Most catches in the tournament
Note: Only lists players with 6 catches or more.

Wicket-keeping

Most dismissals in a match
Note: only top five performances listed (sorted by dismissals then date).

Most dismissals in the tournament
Note: Only top 10 players shown.

Tied matches
After the tied semifinal match in the 1999 Cricket World cup that eliminated them South Africa were held to another tie when they scored 229 in 45 overs, needing 230 to win by the Duckworth–Lewis method, against Sri Lanka. South Africa needed a win to progress to the "Super-6" stage, but were ultimately eliminated from the tournament.

Notes

See also
 Cricket statistics
 Cricket terminology
 Cricket World Cup records
 2007 Cricket World Cup statistics

References

Cricket World Cup statistics
statistics